This article provides a list of United Kingdom Whig and allied party leaders from 1801 to 1859. During the 19th century, the Whigs, Radicals and Peelites gradually evolved into the Liberal Party. The Liberal Party was formally established in 1859 and continued to exist until it merged with the Social Democratic Party in 1988 to create the Liberal Democrats.

End of the age of factions

When the United Kingdom came into existence, on 1 January 1801, the era of disciplined mass parties had not yet begun. Although individuals and families regarded themselves as belonging to a Whig or Tory tradition, actual political allegiance tended to be to family connections and to factions grouped behind a prominent political leader. Most of these loose associations of politicians, after the disappearance of almost any party bonds by about 1760 and the accession of George III, contained members from both Whig and Tory traditions.

In the first decade of the 19th century most politicians realigned themselves into fairly cohesive Whig and Tory parties. Thereafter individuals and groups might move between the two parties, but they both maintained a continuous existence (through a number of mergers and name changes). These two groups were the direct ancestors of the 21st-century Liberal Democrat and Conservative parties.

There were several stages in the consolidation of the parties:

Until 1801 Prime Minister William Pitt the Younger commanded the support of most of the House of Commons. The Pittite coalition of Tories and pro-government Whigs had supported Pitt through the Revolutionary Wars with France. His principal opposition was the relatively weak faction of Whigs, led by Charles James Fox. For four years after 1797 opposition attendance at Westminster had been sporadic as Fox pursued a strategy of secession from Parliament. Only a small group, led by George Tierney, had attended frequently to oppose the ministers. As Foord observes "only once did the minority reach seventy-five, and it was often less than ten".
1801–1804 The King shattered the Pittite coalition when he forced Pitt to resign over Catholic emancipation. The former followers of Pitt divided into three groups: the supporters of the new Prime Minister Henry Addington, a Pittite faction which supported Addington but would not join his government, and the Grenvillite Whigs who joined the Foxites in opposition.
1804–1806 Pitt returned to power and it was the turn of Addington's faction to be semi-detached from the ministry. Fox and Grenville continued in outright opposition. Pitt died in 1806, but his supporters could not form a new administration.
1806–1807 Lord Grenville formed the Ministry of All the Talents, combining the Grenvillite, Foxite and Addingtonian factions. The Pittites were in opposition. However Fox died during 1806 and that weakened the government. The hostility of the King made this a short-lived ministry. It did however reinforce the tendency of the two Whig factions to work together.
1807 onwards In government after 1807 the ex-Pittite and (from 1812) the Addingtonian factions increasingly began to call themselves the Tory Party. In opposition, the leading Whig in the House of Commons was Fox's political heir Viscount Howick. However, when he became the 2nd Earl Grey in 1807, he and Grenville agreed to propose a leader to the Whigs in the Commons. This person was the first MP to be recognised as Leader of the Opposition, rather than leader of an opposition. From this time almost all of the politicians who called themselves Whigs, were supporters of an organised Whig Party. The few remaining veterans on the government side who still called themselves Whigs (notably the Prime Minister, the Duke of Portland) gradually left the political scene, so something resembling a two party system developed.

Leadership selection
There was only a leader of the Whig Party as a whole, when a party member (or the leader of an allied group like the Peelites) was Prime Minister or (from 1830) was the most recent Prime Minister from the party and was still in active politics. At other times the leaders in the House of Lords and House of Commons were of equal status and in theory jointly led the party.

When a new leader was required, with the party in government, the monarch selected him by appointing someone as First Lord of the Treasury.

When no overall party leader was a member of a House and a new leader was required in opposition, a leader emerged and was approved by party members in that House. Before 1807 faction leaders were not necessarily followed by all opposition Whigs. However, by 1807 the party in the House of Commons, as opposed to a faction or factions within it, had acquired recognised leaders.

Lists of Whig Party leaders

Leaders of the Whig Party

In the House of Commons
Charles James Fox and Viscount Howick, as unofficial leaders of the party in the House of Commons from 1801 to 1807, led the largest of the anti-Pittite Whig groups. They were the successive government leaders of the House of Commons during the Ministry of All the Talents. Howick continued as a faction leader in opposition during 1807, until he inherited his peerage. From the appointment of George Ponsonby in 1808 the leaders were official.

In the House of Lords
No attempt is made to include a leader in the House of Lords in the table below before 1830, except during the Ministry of All the Talents. Earl Grey was probably the leading Whig in the House from 1807, particularly once Lord Grenville retired in 1817.

See also

 Liberalism in the United Kingdom
 Leader of the Liberal Democrats
 Leader of the Liberal Democrats in the House of Lords
 Leader of the Liberal Party (UK)

Notes

References
Archibald S. Foord, His Majesty's Opposition 1714–1830. Oxford University Press, 1964.
Roy Jenkins, Gladstone. Macmillan, 1995. .
Jonathan Parry, The Rise and Fall of Liberal Government in Victorian Britain. Yale, 1993. .

External links
Liberal Democrat History Group

Whig and allied party leaders
Whig (British political party) politicians
United Kingdom Whig and allied party leaders